Royal Air Force Holmsley South or more simply RAF Holmsley South is a former Royal Air Force station in Hampshire, England.

Opened in 1942, it was used by both the Royal Air Force and United States Army Air Forces.  During the war it was used primarily as a bomber and later as a transport airfield.  After the war it was closed in late 1946. Christchurch Council from December 1946 to 1961 used the old accommodation sites including WAAF Nissen Huts as temporary accommodation for families waiting for a council house.

Today the remains of the airfield are part of a Forestry Commission project near the New Forest.

RAF Use

The following RAF squadrons were here at some point:

Additional RAF units:

USAAF use
Holmsley South was known as USAAF Station AAF-455 for security reasons by the USAAF during the war, and by which it was referred to instead of location.  Its USAAF Station Code was "HM".

The 394th Bomb Group moved to Holmsley from RAF Boreham between 24 and 28 July 1944.   Operational squadrons of the group were:
 584th Bomb Squadron (K5)
 585th Bomb Squadron (4T)
 586th Bomb Squadron (H9)
 587th Bomb Squadron (5W)
The group remained in the theater to serve with United States Air Forces in Europe as part of the army of occupation at Kitzingen, Germany. It was transferred, without personnel and equipment, to the United States on 15 February 1946 and was inactivated on 31 March 1946.

Current use
With the facility released from military control in 1946, Holmsley South has since stood derelict and, while a few odd parts of the runways and a few dispersal points remain, the vast majority of the concreted areas have been removed along with the buildings around the airfield leaving a large open area. Some other areas have been planted with conifers by the Forestry Commission. Several public camping sites and a caravan park have been created on the former hardstanding groupings along the northeast side of the main perimeter track, as well as both sides of the former 07 runway on the southwest of the airfield.

See also

List of former Royal Air Force stations

References

Citations

Bibliography

 Freeman, Roger A. (1994) UK Airfields of the Ninth: Then and Now 1994. After the Battle 
 Freeman, Roger A. (1996) The Ninth Air Force in Colour: UK and the Continent-World War Two. After the Battle 

 Maurer, Maurer (1983). Air Force Combat Units Of World War II. Maxwell AFB, Alabama: Office of Air Force History. .
 USAAS-USAAC-USAAF-USAF Aircraft Serial Numbers--1908 to present

External links

 Photographs of RAF Holmsley South from the Geograph British Isles project
 Aerial Photo of RAF Holmsley South from Multimap.Com
 New Forest Airfields - NFA1:Holmsley South

Airfields of the 9th Bombardment Division in the United Kingdom
Royal Air Force stations in Hampshire
Military airbases established in 1942
Military installations closed in 1946
1942 establishments in the United Kingdom